Leptolalax croceus (orange-bellied leaf-litter toad) is a species of toad in the family Megophryidae. Discovered in the Central Vietnam in 2010, it is endemic to the region as it is only known from its type locality, Ngoc Linh Nature Reserve in Đắk Glei District, Kon Tum Province. However, given the vicinity of the border to Laos it is also likely to be found there. Its belly has light orange color, which is unique among Leptolalax. It is a medium-sized species within its genus: snout-vent length of 16 males was in the range . The species was found from evergreen 
forest at about  elevation.

References

croceus
Kon Tum province
Endemic fauna of Vietnam
2010 in Vietnam
Amphibians of Vietnam
Amphibians described in 2010